Sindre Magne Rekdal (born 16 July 1970) is a Norwegian former football player, most notably for Molde FK.

Career

Molde
Rekdal started his senior career at Molde in 1988. On 3 July 1988, he made his debut for the club as a substitute in Molde's 2–2 draw at home ground against Vålerengen. On 21 June 1992, he scored his first goal in Molde's 3–2 away win over Brann. He was in the starting lineup in the final of the 1994 Norwegian Cup where Molde won the club's first major trophy after defeating Lyn 3–2 on 23 October.

In his last season at Molde, Rekdal was removed from the first-team squad and placed in the reserve squad, allegedly to make room for younger players. His brother, Kjetil Rekdal later said that this move was a result of an earlier conflict between the club and his brother.  The conflict ended when Sindre Rekdal signed for Belgian side Eendracht Aalst later in the 1998 season. Rekdal played 123 top division games and scored 9 goals during his 11 seasons at Molde.

Belgium and later career
Rekdal signed for Eendracht Aalst in 1998 and spent a total of five seasons in Belgium, including a spell at Dender. In 2003, his last year as active footballer, Rekdal played one season for third tier side Follo.

Personal life
He is the brother of football coach and former Norway international and Molde player Kjetil Rekdal.

References

External links
Sindre Rekdal NFF profile

1970 births
Living people
People from Vestnes
Norwegian footballers
Molde FK players
S.C. Eendracht Aalst players
Follo FK players
Eliteserien players
Norwegian First Division players
Norwegian Second Division players
Norwegian expatriate footballers
Expatriate footballers in Belgium
Norwegian expatriate sportspeople in Belgium
Association football midfielders
Sportspeople from Møre og Romsdal